Trevor Lacey (born October 13, 1991) is an American professional basketball player. He played college basketball for Alabama and North Carolina State.

High school career
Lacey played at Butler High School in Huntsville, Alabama, where he helped the Rebels to Class 5A titles in 2008 and 2009, earning three consecutive Class first-team selections, including a Player of the Year selection in 2010. He added the Class 4A championship in 2011 and added Class Player of the Year and first team selections again after averaging almost 32 points a game. After first receiving the award in 2010, Lacey was named Alabama Mr. Basketball in 2011, becoming only the second player to win it twice.

College career
The Alabama native played collegiately for Alabama of the Southeastern Conference in the NCAA Division I from 2011 to 2013.

He transferred to NC State of the Atlantic Coast Conference (ACC) in 2013, sitting out the 2013-14 season. His junior season was his only one with the Wolfpack, averaging 15.7 points, 4.6 rebounds and 3.5 assists as the side reached the NCAA Tournament Sweet 16. He received Second Team All-ACC honours at the end of the season.

Professional career
Lacey declared for the 2015 NBA draft prior to his senior season, forgoing his final year of eligibility. He would go undrafted, later playing with the Cleveland Cavaliers in the Las Vegas Summer League during July 2015.

The same month, Lacey joined Italian Serie A side Consultinvest Pesaro.

On June 24, 2016, Lacey signed with Dinamo Sassari for the 2016–17 season.

On July 10, 2017, Lacey signed a two-year contract with Russian club Lokomotiv Kuban.

For the 2019–20 season, Lacey joined the Wisconsin Herd of the NBA G League. On March 7, 2020, he posted 16 points, three rebounds, one assist and one steal in a 136-122 win over the Capital City Go-Go. Lacey averaged 4.7 points, 2.1 rebounds and 1.4 assists per game in 36 games for the Wisconsin Herd.

In February 2021, Lacey was signed by German second-division side Rostock Seawolves, coached by Dirk Bauermann. Lacey made 16 appearances for the Rostock team in 2020-21, averaging 14.8 points, 4.7 assists and 4.4 rebounds per contest. He signed with APU Udine of the Serie A2 on July 6, 2021.

References

External links
NC State Wolfpack bio
Alabama Crimson Tide bio

1991 births
Living people
Alabama Crimson Tide men's basketball players
American expatriate basketball people in Germany
American expatriate basketball people in Italy
American expatriate basketball people in Russia
American men's basketball players
Basketball players from Alabama
Dinamo Sassari players
Lega Basket Serie A players
NC State Wolfpack men's basketball players
Parade High School All-Americans (boys' basketball)
PBC Lokomotiv-Kuban players
Shooting guards
Sportspeople from Huntsville, Alabama
Vanoli Cremona players
Victoria Libertas Pallacanestro players
Wisconsin Herd players